Chad Hackenbracht (born November 7, 1991) is an American professional stock car racing driver.

Career
Hackenbracht began his racing career in 2003, competing in Mid Western Quarter Midget Association races; in 2006 he moved to Legends car racing. He made his debut in the ARCA Racing Series in 2010 at Daytona International Speedway; he competed in 47 races in the series over the next three years, He nearly won at Chicagoland Speedway in 2011, leading the most laps in the race before blowing a tire while leading with 15 laps remaining; in 2012 he scored his first win in the series at Pocono Raceway in August.

In 2013, Hackenbracht signed with TriStar Motorsports to drive the team's No. 44 Toyotas in seven Nationwide Series races that year; in June, he added four Camping World Truck Series races to his schedule, driving the No. 51 Toyota for Kyle Busch Motorsports. He also raced in the NASCAR Canadian Tire Series in September at Canadian Tire Motorsport Park.

Hackenbracht entered the 2014 racing season looking for a regular ride.

Motorsports career results

NASCAR
(key) (Bold – Pole position awarded by qualifying time. Italics – Pole position earned by points standings or practice time. * – Most laps led.)

Nationwide Series

Camping World Truck Series

Canadian Tire Series

 Season still in progress
 Ineligible for series points

ARCA Racing Series
(key) (Bold – Pole position awarded by qualifying time. Italics – Pole position earned by points standings or practice time. * – Most laps led.)

References

External links
 
 

Living people
1991 births
People from New Philadelphia, Ohio
Racing drivers from Ohio
NASCAR drivers
ARCA Menards Series drivers